Leo Zobel (28 January 1895, Nitra - 25 April 1962) was a Slovak chess master.

He won the 7th Czechoslovak Chess Championship at Prague 1931. He also took 12th at Trenčianske Teplice 1928 (Boris Kostić won), tied for 9-10th at Brno 1929 (the 6th CSR-ch, Karel Opočenský won), and tied for 10-11th at Stubňanské Teplice 1930 (Andor Lilienthal won).

References

External links

1895 births
1962 deaths
Sportspeople from Nitra
Slovak Jews
Slovak chess players
Jewish chess players
20th-century chess players